Mount Decoeli is a  pyramidal peak located in the Kluane Ranges of the Saint Elias Mountains in Yukon, Canada. Its nearest higher peak is Mount Archibald,  to the south. The mountain's name was officially adopted August 12, 1980, by the Geographical Names Board of Canada. James J. McArthur was a Canadian surveyor and mountaineer who undertook extensive surveying in the Yukon during his later years. In 1908 he made the first ascent of Williams Peak accompanied by Edmond Treau de Coeli (1873–1963). Decoeli is pronounced deh-coh-lie. To the Southern Tutchone people, the mountain is known as Nàday Gän, meaning Dried Lynx Mountain. 

Climbing the peak is a long strenuous day hike of  elevation gain over a distance of  round trip, with a scramble via the south face and south ridge. On a clear day, the summit offers views into Kluane National Park of giants such as Mt. Logan, Mt. Vancouver, and Mt. Kennedy. A repeater is installed at the summit.

Climate

Based on the Köppen climate classification, Mount Decoeli is located in a subarctic climate zone with long, cold, snowy winters, and mild summers.  The annual average temperature in the neighborhood is -6 ° C. The warmest month is July, when the average temperature is 8 °C, and the coldest is December when temperatures can drop below −20 °C with wind chill factors below −30 °C. Precipitation runoff from the peak and meltwater from its rock glacier drains into tributaries of the Kaskawulsh River.

See also

List of mountains of Canada
Geography of Yukon

References

External links
 Mount Decoeli photo: Flickr
 Parks Canada: Climbing route Mt. Decoeli
 Weather forecast: Mount Decoeli
 Views from the peak: adventuresoflupe.com

Two-thousanders of Yukon
Saint Elias Mountains